QuantumScape is an American company that develops solid state lithium metal batteries for electric cars. The company is headquartered in San Jose, California and employs around 400 people. Investors include Bill Gates and Volkswagen.

History 
QuantumScape was founded in 2010 by Jagdeep Singh, Tim Holme and Professor Fritz Prinz of Stanford University. In 2012, QuantumScape began working with German automaker Volkswagen.

In 2018, Volkswagen invested $100 million in the company, becoming the largest shareholder. In the same year, Volkswagen and QuantumScape announced the establishment of a joint production project to prepare for mass production of solid state batteries. In June 2020, Volkswagen made an additional $200 million investment into the company.

On September 3, 2020, QuantumScape announced a merger with the special-purpose acquisition company Kensington Capital Acquisition. As a result of the merger, QuantumScape will receive $1 billion in financing, including funding from Volkswagen and the Qatar Investment Authority. At the same time, the company's shares will be listed on the New York Stock Exchange under the symbol QS. The transaction was completed in November 2020 and raised capital for the series production of batteries.
In the last quarter of 2020, QuantumScape briefly surpassed the valuation of Ford Motor Co. without having any commercial product and with zero revenue.

On April 15, 2021, hedge fund Scorpion Capital announced their short position in the stock, accusing the company of being a pump-and-dump scheme.

On June 26, 2022, the Company announced the production of a solid-state battery with a range of 650 km and a charge time of 15 minutes.

References

External links 
 

2010 establishments in California
2020 initial public offerings
Companies listed on the New York Stock Exchange
American companies established in 2010
Electronics companies established in 2010
Electric vehicle battery manufacturers
Electronics companies of the United States
Manufacturing companies based in San Jose, California
Solid-state batteries
Technology companies based in the San Francisco Bay Area
Special-purpose acquisition companies